2020 in film  is an overview of events, including the highest-grossing films, award ceremonies, critics' lists of the best films of 2020, festivals, a list of country-specific lists of films released, and notable deaths.

Evaluation of the year
The year was greatly affected by the COVID-19 pandemic, with numerous films originally scheduled for theatrical release postponed or released on video on demand or streaming services. However, it is to be kept in mind that several film companies stopped reporting box-office numbers during this time due to the pandemic, and several films were still in theatres where guidelines enabled them so. As a result, numbers will grow if they are re-released in the future to compensate for the impact this pandemic has had on consumers and film-watchers.

Highest-grossing films

The top films released in 2020 by worldwide gross are as follows:

After being re-released in 4K in China, earning $26.4 million, the overall gross for the 2001 film Harry Potter and the Philosopher's Stone increased to over $1.008 billion, becoming the 47th film overall and the second billion-dollar film in the Wizarding World franchise, after Harry Potter and the Deathly Hallows – Part 2, at $1.342 billion.

2020 box office records
 China overtook North America as the world's largest box office market for the first time in 2020. China generated  in theatrical revenue compared to North America's , the lowest for the North American box office in at least 40 years. This has been largely attributed to the COVID-19 pandemic having a greater negative impact in North America than in China.
 Because of the relatively smaller impact of the pandemic on Asian film markets, the majority (6) of the top ten highest-grossing films of the year are East Asian (Chinese and Japanese) productions for the first time in history, as the rankings were previously dominated by North American productions.

Film records
 At the end of 2020, The Eight Hundred became the first Chinese and first non-Hollywood film to top the global box office with more than $450 million gross. It was later overtaken by Demon Slayer the Movie: Mugen Train in May 2021.
 Demon Slayer the Movie: Mugen Train, a Japanese anime film based on the manga series Demon Slayer: Kimetsu no Yaiba, broke a number of box office records.
 It became the first ever non-Hollywood film production to become the highest-grossing film of the year.
 It set the all-time box office records for the highest-grossing Japanese film, the highest-grossing anime film, and the highest-grossing R-rated animated film.
It went on to have the highest-grossing second weekend, and in ten days became the fastest film to cross , surpassing Spirited Away (2001) which had previously crossed the  milestone in 19 days and held the record for 19 years. Mugen Train also became the fastest film to cross  in Japan, again faster than Spirited Away. It also set the record for the highest-grossing IMAX release in Japan, surpassing the previous record holder Bohemian Rhapsody (2018). In 59 days, Mugen Train set another record as the fastest film to cross the  milestone, faster than Spirited Away which took 253 days to reach the same milestone. In 66 days, the film set another record as the first film to top the Japanese box office charts for ten straight weekends (since the charts began publication in 2004). In 73 days, Mugen Train grossed  to become the highest-grossing film of all time in Japan, surpassing Spirited Away which held the record for 19 years.
 In Taiwan, Mugen Train grossed  in 17 days, setting the record for the highest-grossing animated film of all time in Taiwan, surpassing the previous record holders Frozen 2 (2019) and Your Name (2016). In 20 days, Mugen Train became the first animated film to cross  in Taiwan, before later crossing the  milestone.
The film was also the first R-rated film since Die Hard with a Vengeance in 1995 to be the highest-grossing film of the year overall.
The film was also the first animated film since The Jungle Book in 1967 to be the highest-grossing film of the year overall and not the highest-grossing animated film of all time at the time.
 Sonic the Hedgehog broke Pokémon: Detective Pikachus record for the highest opening weekend for a film based on a video game, with $70 million domestic gross in the United States and Canada. It went on to become the highest-grossing film based on a video game in the United States and Canada, surpassing Detective Pikachu, although it did not beat it in the worldwide box office. Sonic the Hedgehog is also the highest-grossing superhero film of 2020, ending the Marvel Cinematic Universe's decade-long run of having the highest-grossing superhero film of the year (from 2010 to 2019).
For the first time in box office history, two non-American animated film productions (Asian films), Demon Slayer the Movie: Mugen Train from Japan and Jiang Ziya from China, have become the highest-grossing animated films of the year. This has been partly attributed to the COVID-19 pandemic. It is also the first time since 1987 that a non-American animated film (Japanese anime), Demon Slayer the Movie: Mugen Train, became the highest-grossing animated film of the year, and the first time an anime has made it to the top 10 highest-grossing films of the year worldwide.
2020 was the first year since 2008 not to have a film gross $1 billion in its initial release, the first year since 2005 not to have a film gross over $900 million, and the first year since 2000 not to have a film gross over $600 million, attributed to the COVID-19 pandemic.

Events

Award ceremonies

Festivals
List of some of the film festivals for 2020 that have been accredited by the International Federation of Film Producers Associations (FIAPF).

Awards

2020 films

By country 

 List of American films of 2020
 List of Australian films of 2020
 List of Bangladeshi films of 2020
 List of British films of 2020
 List of Canadian films of 2020
 List of Chinese films of 2020
 List of Hong Kong films of 2020
 List of Filipino films of 2020
 List of Indian films of 2020
 List of Japanese films of 2020
 List of Pakistani films of 2020
 List of Portuguese films of 2020
 List of Russian films of 2020
 List of South Korean films of 2020

By genre/medium 
 2020 in science fiction film
 List of animated feature films of 2020

Deaths

Film debuts
Grace VanderWaal – Stargirl
Allison Wentworth – Stargirl

Notes

References

 
Film by year